John Russo (born November 10, 1973) is an American baseball coach. He graduated from the University of West Alabama in 2000. Russo served as an assistant coach at West Alabama while completing a degree in secondary education and a concentration in physical education.  He worked with the Tigers hitters from 1998 until his graduation in 2000, helping them set several program records.  He then moved to Saint Joseph's in Rensselaer, Indiana, serving as infield coach and academic advisor for his five seasons.  From 2005 to 2008, Russo worked as a teacher and athletic director in Wadsworth, Illinois.  During his summers, Russo coached the Vermont Mountaineers of the New England Collegiate Baseball League.  He led the Mountaineers to the 2006 and 2007 NECBL Championship.  In 2008, Russo earned the top assistant coaching position at Hofstra Pride.  After Patrick Anderson's resignation to work for the Hagerstown Suns just before the 2012, season, Russo became interim head coach, and was named to the position permanently after leading the Pride to a second-place finish in the CAA.

Head coaching record

References

External links
John Russo, Head Baseball Coach Hofstra University Pride

1973 births
Living people
Hofstra Pride baseball coaches
Saint Joseph's Pumas baseball coaches
University of West Alabama alumni
West Alabama Tigers baseball coaches
People from Rensselaer, Indiana
People from Wadsworth, Illinois